Multivox was an American-based synthesizer company since the mid-1970s until the 1980s. Originally it was founded in the mid-1940s as the guitar and amplifier manufacturing subsidiary of Peter Sorkin Music Company (Sorkin Music), a New York-based retailer/wholesaler. Then eventually it established separate corporate identity, and after the close of Sorkin Music in the mid-1970s, it continued in existence for fourteen years, according to the Blue Book of Guitar Values. In addition to synthesizers, the company marketed several effects pedals. These included the Big Jam series guitar effects line.

They specialized in delivering Japanese-designed and built equipment to the American market. They usually licensed from  Japanese companies, such as Hillwood, also known as Firstman, founded in 1972 by Kazuo Morioka, who later worked for Akai in the early 1980s. Multivox ceased trading in the early 1980s having "faded into synth history", according to the Synthmuseum.

Re-branding 
As a result of the old criticism of Multivox synthesizer technology and their comparisons with Roland hardware, several hoax/fraudulent cases have occurred. The main hoax was based around a Multivox MX-3000 synthesizer (the flagship of the Multivox range). These machines are quite rare although not particularly sought for by collectors and musicians. Hence when a Roland MX-3000 was offered for sale much controversy surrounding the original Multivox design was stirred up. Eventually the seller admitted that the synthesizer was in fact Multivox, but he had re-badged it in an attempt to generate interest.

The Multivox range

Synthesizers 
Multivox produced over 15 different types of synthesizers, almost all with names beginning with "MX-" (except for SQ-01).
MX-20 - An electric piano produced from 1977 to 1978. Had five presets (high/low piano and clavichord and 'honky tonk') and a bass split with independent volume control. 61 key keyboard. Tune, Sustain and vibrato controls.
MX-28 - The MX-28's literature says (C)1981. It is very similar to MX20 except that it uses sliders instead of rotary knobs and has a Phaser instead of vibrato. It also has a built in speaker on the right side. The 'high/low' variations of the voices is omitted, but on this machine you can actually blend the voices together.
MX-30 - This model is a slight expansion on the MX-20 having a 61-key velocity-sensitive keyboard.
MX-51 - Another piano-based model.
MX-57/Electro-Snare - A drum synthesizer with 2VCO/VCF/VCA/SWEEP. The design is similar to the Star Instruments SYNARE 3.
MX-65 - Polyphonic Keyboard with 6 string sounds. Envelope, LFO and Ensemble controls.
MX-75 - Duophonic preset synthesizer with aftertouch effect. Also known as Pulser M75. Developed by Hillwood.
MX-99 - Mini Echo - An analog delay with volume tone repeat and delay controls
MX-150/Basky II - An organ-style bass pedal.
MX-202 - String & Bass ensemble. Very similar to the Roland RS-202 synthesizer.
MX-440 - Same as above. Some MX-440 might be re-badged MX-202.
MX-450 - Very rare Bass Pedal. Little is known. More sources needed.
MX-880 DUO - Same as below.
MX-2000 DUO - Duophonic preset synthesizer with aftertouch effect. It has similarities with the Roland SH-2000 design, but are different instruments. Developed by Hillwood.
MX-3000 - The largest and most feature-laden synthesizer of the range. Includes an individual bass synth, preset synth, preset edit synth, and monophonic lead synth. And a blend control for all 4 synths. Also known as Pulser M85. Developed by Hillwood.

Digital sequencers 

SQ-01 - A combination of synthesizer and sequencer. Performs bass synth functions similar to the later Roland TB-303. Originally released in 1980 by Hillwood under Firstman brand, before Multivox released it in 1981.<ref name="Synrise-Firstman">
{{cite web
 | title     = Firstman International
 | url       = http://www.synrise.de/docs/types/f/firstman.htm
 | archiveurl= https://web.archive.org/web/20030420170643/http://www.synrise.de/docs/types/f/firstman.htm
 | archivedate=2003-04-20
 | language  = German
 | work      = SYNRISE
 | quote     = FIRSTMAN existiert seit 1972 und hat seinen Ursprung in Japan. Dort ist dieFirma unter dem Markennamen HILLWOOD bekannt. HILLWOOD baute dann auch 1973 den quasi ersten Synthesizer von FIRSTMAN. Die Firma MULTIVOX liess ihre Instrumente von 1976 bis 1980 bei HILLWOOD bauen.  Siehe auch Hinweis unter SORKIN MUSIC CO.! Nach Europa gelangten die FIRSTMAN-Produkte über TAIYO. ","SQ/01 / mon syn ped kmi 990 (1980) / Monophoner Synthesizer mit eingebautem 1024-Step-Sequencer. Ähnlich dem EDP WASP mit einer 13er-Folientastatur ausgestattet. Für Parameterveränderungen stehen neun Drehregler zur Verfügung."
}}</ref>

MX-8100 Sequencer - Digital keyboard sequencer with up to 4 patterns depending on how much memory you use for the patterns. The MX-8100 has separate outputs for V/Oct and Hz/V control voltages. Developed by Hillwood.MX-S100 - Misreference- no such model exists.

 Drum machines 

Rhythm Ace FR-3S - Multivox version of Rhythm Ace analog drum machine. It seems released after the Multivox/Sorkin Music stopped the engage with former OEM manufacturers, Ace Tone by Ace Electronics and Roland Corporation. AnalogAudio1 on YouTube pointed out the similarity with Korg Mini-Pops hardware.

 Effect processors 
LD-2/Little David - One of the world first Leslie speaker simulator.

 Big Jam series - guitar effect pedals

SE-1 Phaser - Phaser
SE-2 Spit Wah - Auto Wah - It is a close clone to the Mutron III filter. For this reason and because it is a rare pedal it is becoming increasingly sought after since the 2010s. 
SE-3 Compressor - Compressor
SE-4 Octave - Octaver
SE-5 Flanjam Flanger - Flanger
SE-6 Graphic Equalizer - 6 band analog EQ band sliders for 100 Hz, 200 Hz, 400 Hz, 800 Hz, 1.6 kHz, 3.2 kHz
SE-7 Delay Machine - Delay/Reverb with Mode switch for Delay/(Rev)erb, Delay, Repeat, (Bal)ance
SE-8 Distortion - Distortion
SE-9 Biphase Phaser - Dual Phaser with Width, Rate, and (Reso)nance sliders
SE-10 Quartz Guitar Tuner - Tuner
SE-11 Jazz Flanger - Flanger
SE-12 Chorus - Chorus with Warp, Speed, Depth sliders
SE-13 Space Driver - Boost/Overdrive with Expand, Drive, and Level sliders
SE-14 Stop Noise - Noise Gate with Sensitivity and Decay slider controls
SE-15 "Unknown" -
SE-16 "Unknown" -
SE-17 "Unknown" -
SE-18 Parametric EQ - Parametric Eq
SE-XP Pulse Regulator Power Supply - A Power supply that powered up to 5 Big Jam Effects units via 9 volt dc supply and cables.
SE-PB Pedal Board - Self-enclosed pedal board that included the SE-XP Pulse Power Supply and room for up to 5 Big Jam Effects in a flight case design with power cables and linking audio jacks connections.

 See also 
 Multivox Premier

 External links 

 Synthmusem.com: Multivox - List of Multivox instruments.
 Sonic State: Multibox - Reviews of Multivox instruments.
 SYNRISE - Multivox Corporation of America - Another product list including fairly unknown models (in Deutsche. Internet Archive cache at 2005-02-21'').

References 

Synthesizer manufacturing companies of the United States